Koeppel may refer to:
Alfred J. Koeppel (1932–2001), American real estate developer 
Gerhard Koeppel (1936–2012), German historian of Roman art
Horst Köppel (born 1948), German football manager and former player
Dan Koeppel (born 1962), American author
Roger Köppel (born 1965), Swiss politician, journalist, entrepreneur and publicist

See also
 Koppel (disambiguation)